Killingbeck and Seacroft is a ward in the metropolitan borough of the City of Leeds, West Yorkshire, England.  It contains eight listed buildings that are recorded in the National Heritage List for England.  All the listed buildings are designated at Grade II, the lowest of the three grades, which is applied to "buildings of national importance and special interest".  The ward contains the former village of Seacroft to the northeast of the centre of Leeds, and later developments westward towards the city centre, which include Killingbeck and Fearnville.  The listed buildings consist of houses and associated structures, a church, a public house, a former public house later a guest house, and a former water tower.


Buildings

References

Citations

Sources

 

Lists of listed buildings in West Yorkshire